Sensitization is a non-associative learning process in which repeated administration of a stimulus results in the progressive amplification of a response. Sensitization often is characterized by an enhancement of response to a whole class of stimuli in addition to the one that is repeated. For example, repetition of a painful stimulus may make one more responsive to a loud noise.

History
Eric Kandel was one of the first to study the neural basis of sensitization, conducting experiments in the 1960s and 1970s on the gill withdrawal reflex of the seaslug Aplysia. Kandel and his colleagues first habituated the reflex, weakening the response by repeatedly touching the animal's siphon. They then paired noxious electrical stimulus to the tail with a touch to the siphon, causing the gill withdrawal response to reappear. After this sensitization, a light touch to the siphon alone produced a strong gill withdrawal response, and this sensitization effect lasted for several days. (After Squire and Kandel, 1999). In 2000, Eric Kandel was awarded the Nobel Prize in Physiology or Medicine for his research in neuronal learning processes.

Neural substrates

The neural basis of behavioral sensitization is often not known, but it typically seems to result from a cellular receptor becoming more likely to respond to a stimulus. Several examples of neural sensitization include:
 Electrical or chemical stimulation of the rat hippocampus causes strengthening of synaptic signals, a process known as long-term potentiation or LTP. LTP of AMPA receptors is a potential mechanism underlying memory and learning in the brain.
 In "kindling", repeated stimulation of hippocampal or amygdaloid neurons in the limbic system eventually leads to seizures in laboratory animals. After sensitization, very little stimulation may be required to produce seizures. Thus, kindling has been suggested as a model for temporal lobe epilepsy in humans, where stimulation of a repetitive type (flickering lights for instance) can cause epileptic seizures. Often, people suffering from temporal lobe epilepsy report symptoms of negative effects such as anxiety and depression that might result from limbic dysfunction.
 In "central sensitization", nociceptive neurons in the dorsal horns of the spinal cord become sensitized by peripheral tissue damage or inflammation. This type of sensitization has been suggested as a possible causal mechanism for chronic pain conditions.  The changes of central sensitization occur after repeated trials to pain.  Research from animals has consistently shown that when a trial is repeatedly exposed to a painful stimulus, the animal’s pain threshold will change and result in a stronger pain response.  Researchers believe that there are parallels that can be drawn between these animal trials and persistent pain in people.  For example, after a back surgery that removed a herniated disc from causing a pinched nerve, the patient may still continue to "feel" pain.  Also, newborns who are circumcised without anesthesia have shown tendencies to react more greatly to future injections, vaccinations, and other similar procedures.  The responses of these children are an increase in crying and a greater hemodynamic response (tachycardia and tachypnea).
 Drug sensitization occurs in drug addiction, and is defined as an increased effect of drug following repeated doses (the opposite of drug tolerance). Such sensitization involves changes in brain mesolimbic dopamine transmission, as well as a protein inside mesolimbic neurons called delta FosB. An associative process may contribute to addiction, for environmental stimuli associated with drug taking may increase craving. This process may increase the risk for relapse in addicts attempting to quit.

Cross-sensitization

Cross-sensitization is a phenomenon in which sensitization to a stimulus is generalized to a related stimulus, resulting in the amplification of a particular response to both the original stimulus and the related stimulus. For example, cross-sensitization to the neural and behavioral effects of addictive drugs are well characterized, such as sensitization to the locomotor response of a stimulant resulting in cross-sensitization to the motor-activating effects of other stimulants.  Similarly, reward sensitization to a particular addictive drug often results in reward cross-sensitization, which entails sensitization to the rewarding property of other addictive drugs in the same drug class or even certain natural rewards.

In animals, cross-sensitization has been established between the consumption of many different types of drugs of abuse – in line with the gateway drug theory – and also between sugar consumption and the self-administration of drugs of abuse.

As a causal factor in pathology
Sensitization has been implied as a causal or maintaining mechanism in a wide range of apparently unrelated pathologies including addiction, allergies, asthma, overactive bladder and some medically unexplained syndromes such as fibromyalgia and multiple chemical sensitivity. Sensitization may also contribute to psychological disorders such as post-traumatic stress disorder, panic anxiety and mood disorders.

See also
 Long-term potentiation
 Multiple chemical sensitivity
 Neuroplasticity
 Synaptic plasticity

References

Behaviorism
Learning